Galbooly  can refer to either
Galbooly, a civil parish in County Tipperary  
Galbooly  (townland), one of the six townlands in the above parish
Galbooly Little, another townland in the same parish